= Honorary Distinction of the Mayor of Białystok =

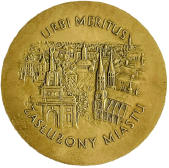
- Awarded for: achievements in various fields
- Country: Poland
- Presented by: the city of Białystok
- First award: January 2022

Honorary Distinction of the Mayor of Białystok "Urbi Meritus - Meritorious for the City" (Polish: Honorowe Wyróżnienie Prezydenta Miasta Białegostoku „Urbi Meritus – Zasłużony Miastu”) is a distinction awarded by the mayor of Bialystok.

== Overview ==
In 2010 the city hall announced the creation of Meritorious for Białystok award (Polish: Zasłużony dla Miasta Białegostoku) but it did not materialize. The award was established in January 2022. It is given to people, institutions or organizations that have made special contributions to the development and promotion of Białystok. The award is handed on the Days of the City of Białystok, an annual city day event taking place in June.
